Pope Celadion (Keladionus) was the 9th Pope and Patriarch of Alexandria, who was reigning from year 152 to 166 AD. 

Celadion was born in Alexandria, Egypt, and was much loved by the people as righteous and wise. He was elected Patriarch in year 152 during the reign of Antoninus Pius. 

When he took over the leadership, he tended the plants left to him by his predecessors. His days were peaceful, and nothing troubled the serenity of the Christians. 

He reigned for fourteen years, six months, and three days, and died during the reign of Marcus Aurelius and Lucius Verus, on the 9th of Epip (16 July), in the year 166 AD.

References 

General

Atiya, Aziz S. The Coptic Encyclopedia. New York: Macmillan Publishing Co., 1991.

External Links 
 The Official website of the Coptic Orthodox Pope of Alexandria and Patriarch of All Africa on the Holy See of Saint Mark the Apostle
 Coptic Documents in French

2nd-century Christian saints
166 deaths
Saints from Roman Egypt
Deans of the Catechetical School of Alexandria
2nd-century Popes and Patriarchs of Alexandria
Year of birth unknown